Simon Christopher Eastwood (born 26 June 1989) is an English professional footballer who plays as a goalkeeper for  club Oxford United.

Eastwood started his career as a youth player with Huddersfield Town. He went professional in 2007, but struggled to break into the first team and went on loan to Woking in 2008 then moved to Bradford City a year later. He made a permanent transfer to Oxford United in 2010 but did not make a first-team appearance, and in the following years he played for FC Halifax Town, Portsmouth, and Blackburn Rovers, before returning to Oxford in 2016.

Eastwood has played internationally for England twice at under-18 and under-19 levels.

Club career

Huddersfield Town
Born in Luton, Bedfordshire, Eastwood was a Huddersfield Town academy goalkeeper who made two appearances on the substitutes' bench in the 2005–06 season at the age of just 16. At the start of the 2006–07 season, he was the third-choice goalkeeper behind Paul Rachubka and new signing Matt Glennon. After Rachubka's departure to Blackpool, Eastwood became second-choice goalkeeper behind Glennon.

Eastwood signed his first professional contract in the summer of 2007. On 16 January 2008, he and fellow Huddersfield youngster Shane Killock signed new one-year contract extensions. This was after he fell behind goalkeeper Alex Smithies in the pecking order. On 27 November 2008, he joined Conference Premier club Woking. His first appearance for Woking was in their 1–1 draw with Rushden & Diamonds on 9 December 2008. Following Huddersfield's 3–1 defeat by Crewe Alexandra on 21 February 2009, he was recalled by manager Lee Clark following an injury to Matt Glennon. Clark gave Eastwood his full debut on the last day of the 2008–09 season, as regular keeper Alex Smithies had a shoulder injury. The match was Huddersfield's 1–1 draw against Leyton Orient at Brisbane Road on 2 May 2009.

Eastwood was contracted to the club until the summer of 2011. He was officially made available for transfer along with seven other players by Town manager Lee Clark on 24 May 2010. On 4 June 2010 he left Huddersfield, having made only one first-team appearance for the club, to join Oxford United for the 2010–11 season.

Bradford City (loan)
On 25 July, he joined League Two club Bradford City on loan until the end of the year. He made his debut in the 5–0 defeat by Notts County at Meadow Lane on 8 August 2009. After 28 appearances (22 in the league) he returned to the Galpharm on 31 December, after Bradford manager Stuart McCall said he needed a more experienced goalkeeper at the club.

Oxford United
On 4 June 2010, Eastwood signed a two-year contract with Oxford United, newly promoted to League Two. However, Eastwood was second-choice goalkeeper behind ever-present Ryan Clarke, who made 50 appearances in the 2010–11 season. After one season at Oxford, having failed to make a first-team appearance, Eastwood was released in May 2011 despite having a year left on his contract.

F.C Halifax Town
On 21 June, Eastwood signed a one-year contract with Conference North club F.C. Halifax Town. On 13 August he made his debut, against Corby Town. He won the competition for first-team place against Phil Senior, making 43 appearances (41 in the league), only missing three league matches. However, at the end of the season he opted to sign a contract with local side Bradford Park Avenue instead of signing again for Halifax.

Portsmouth
On 8 July 2012, Eastwood agreed a contract with Conference North club Bradford Park Avenue. However, just five days later, after Eastwood chose to take a trial with Portsmouth, his contract with Bradford was rescinded, the club stating that it would not stand in his way. After featuring in all Portsmouth's preseason matches, Eastwood joined Pompey on 13 August 2012, on non-contract terms, one day ahead of their League Cup tie against Plymouth Argyle, in which he made his debut. On the eve of the new league season, Portsmouth signed their entire new squad, including signing Mikkel Andersen from Reading on loan. Andersen secured first place in the team, meaning Eastwood was on the bench. Eastwood played his second match on 9 October, in a Football League Trophy second round match against Wycombe Wanderers; the club failed to progress after losing 3–1. However, Eastwood managed to save a penalty although the rebound was scored by Wycombe's Dean Morgan.

Due to limited playing time, Eastwood was the main goalkeeper for Portsmouth's development squad. He made his third first-team appearance in a first round FA Cup match against Notts County, on 3 November. On the following Tuesday, he made his league debut at Fratton Park against Brentford; Pompey lost the League One fixture 1–0. On 20 November 2012, first-choice goalkeeper Andersen made his last appearance for Portsmouth in a 2–3 defeat to Leyton Orient before returning to Premier League club Reading, making Eastwood the only goalkeeper at Portsmouth, and securing his first-team place. Just after Andersen's departure, former Swindon Town goalkeeper Phil Smith was signed, initially as back-up for Eastwood. Eastwood's position was under threat, when former Portsmouth goalkeeper Alan Knight (famous for the most appearances for a Portsmouth player) came in as goalkeeper coach (after the departure of John Keeley). Knight backed Eastwood, and on 2 March 2013 Pompey won their first match in over four months (23 matches), a 2–1 win at Crewe Alexandra, Eastwood's first win as a Portsmouth player. In the next month he kept three clean sheets in six matches, against Bury, Preston North End and Tranmere Rovers. Following Portsmouth's relegation, Eastwood said he was determined to stay at the club for the next season. He was offered a new contract with the club.

Blackburn Rovers
Eastwood rejected Portsmouth's offer and on 13 May 2013 agreed a deal in principle to join Championship club Blackburn Rovers. He made his debut for the club on 7 August 2013 in a first round League Cup tie against Carlisle United, which Blackburn lost on penalties after a 3–3 draw. In December he displaced Jake Kean as first-choice goalkeeper, making his Championship debut for the club on 7 December 2013 in an away match against Queens Park Rangers, putting in an impressive performance and keeping a clean sheet in a 0–0 draw. After seven matches as first choice, Eastwood returned to being back-up as Paul Robinson returned from injury and reclaimed his number one spot. On 28 February 2014, Eastwood signed a new contract until the summer of 2016.

Oxford United
In June 2016, Eastwood signed for Oxford United for the second time, on a one-year contract. He was given the number 1 jersey and played every minute of all 62 first-team matches in 2016–17, including the 2017 EFL Trophy Final at Wembley Stadium. He signed a two-year contract extension in February 2017, and was voted the Supporters' and Players' Player of the Year at the club's end-of-season awards. The following season he was again ever-present in league fixtures, though he was rested for a couple of EFL Trophy games. Eastwood signed a new three-year contract with Oxford in May 2018.

Eastwood suffered a broken finger during the warm-up of the second League One fixture of the 2018–19 season on 11 August 2018, and second-choice goalkeeper Scott Shearer made his first league appearance since arriving at the club two seasons earlier, ending Eastwood's run of 93 consecutive league appearances. Jonathan Mitchell was subsequently loaned from Derby County as emergency cover.

International career
On 27 March 2007, he received his first call-up to the England under-18 team, where he played in their 4–1 win against the Netherlands at Huish Park. On 30 August 2007, he received his first call-up for the England under-19 team in a match against Belarus at Meadow Lane. He played the whole 90 minutes of the match on 11 September, and kept a clean sheet as England won 4–0.

Career statistics

Honours
Oxford United
EFL Trophy runner-up: 2016–17

References

External links
Simon Eastwood profile at the Oxford United F.C. website

1989 births
Living people
Footballers from Luton
English footballers
England youth international footballers
Association football goalkeepers
Huddersfield Town A.F.C. players
Woking F.C. players
Bradford City A.F.C. players
Oxford United F.C. players
FC Halifax Town players
Bradford (Park Avenue) A.F.C. players
Portsmouth F.C. players
Blackburn Rovers F.C. players
National League (English football) players
English Football League players